The Back Mountain is a region and former census-designated place (CDP) in Luzerne County, Pennsylvania,  United States. It is near the cities of Scranton and Wilkes-Barre. The population was 33,551 as of 2016. The area was not delineated as a CDP for the 2010 census. The name "Back Mountain" refers to the area's location behind the mountain ridge forming the northwest side of the Wyoming Valley. The area includes the townships of Dallas, Franklin, Jackson, Kingston, Lake, and Lehman. The region also includes the boroughs of Dallas and Harveys Lake. Each township and borough is independently governed.

History

The townships of Dallas, Franklin, Jackson, Kingston, Lake, and Lehman were formed in the 1800s. The area now known as Dallas was first settled in 1797. It was incorporated as a borough on April 21, 1879, from a section of Dallas Township.  The township, formed in 1817, and was named for Alexander J. Dallas, the 6th United States Secretary of the Treasury and the father of George M. Dallas the vice president of James Polk. The Borough of Dallas is known as the “Pride” of the Back Mountain.

The second borough in the Back Mountain region is Harveys Lake. The lake was named after Benjamin Harvey, who discovered the lake in 1781. He was a member of the Sons of Liberty, an eminent colonial-era group opposed to Great Britain's Stamp Act and a driving force behind the American Revolution. The first resident in the vicinity of the lake, Matthew Scouten, arrived in the early 1790s, others settlers, the Worthingtons, arrived in 1806.

Historically the area offered many forms of recreation and entertainment attracting tourists from all over the Northeast. Harveys Lake became a major resort destination in the early 20th century. Hotels, boathouses, a casino, and an amusement park were constructed around Harveys Lake. Grand Hotel Oneonta was especially prominent in the early 1900s, and former United States President Theodore Roosevelt visited the hotel in August 1912. Harveys Lake was incorporated as a borough in 1968.

Frances Slocum State Park is the only state park in the Back Mountain. In 1968, the lake, which is the centerpiece of the park, was built to control flooding in the North Branch Susquehanna River. In 1972, the park became a temporary home to 280 families who were displaced by the Agnes floods. The park was closed temporarily to the public and reopened in 1974 after all the families were relocated.

Population and geography 
As of 2016, 33,551 people lived in the Back Mountain. It consists of six townships and two boroughs. The Back Mountain is located at  (41.320230, -75.972645). It is home to Frances Slocum State Park, Lake Louise, and Harveys Lake.

Demographics when it was a CDP 
As of the census of 2000, there were 26,690 people, 9,267 households, and 6,894 families residing in the census-designated place (CDP). The population density was 249.5 people per square mile (96.3/km2).  There were 9,997 housing units at an average density of 93.5/sq mi (36.1/km2).  The racial makeup of the CDP was 94.45% White, 4.30% African American, 0.10% Native American, 0.52% Asian, 0.02% Pacific Islander, 0.18% from other races, and 0.43% from two or more races. Hispanic or Latino of any race were 1.05% of the population.

There were 9,267 households, out of which 32.5% had children under the age of 18 living with them, 63.1% were married couples living together, 8.0% had a female householder with no husband present, and 25.6% were non-families. 21.9% of all households were made up of individuals, and 10.8% had someone living alone who was 65 years of age or older.  The average household size was 2.57 and the average family size was 3.01.

In the CDP the population was spread out, with 21.5% under the age of 18, 8.4% from 18 to 24, 29.1% from 25 to 44, 26.5% from 45 to 64, and 14.5% who were 65 years of age or older.  The median age was 40 years. For every 100 females, there were 107.2 males.  For every 100 females age 18 and over, there were 105.7 males.

The median income for a household in the CDP was $49,298, and the median income for a family was $57,342. Males had a median income of $39,566 versus $27,202 for females. The per capita income for the CDP was $23,105.  About 4.8% of families and 6.5% of the population were below the poverty line, including 6.6% of those under age 18 and 8.2% of those age 65 or over.

Education

Public school districts
Dallas School District 
Lake-Lehman School District

Colleges and universities 
 Misericordia University in Dallas
 Penn State Wilkes-Barre in Lehman

Libraries
 Back Mountain Memorial Library

Transportation

Highways

Nearby airports
Wilkes-Barre/Scranton International Airport
Wilkes-Barre Wyoming Valley Airport

Notable people
Lisa Baker, State Senator from Pennsylvania
Raye Hollitt, an American actress, female bodybuilder, and one of the original cast members of American Gladiators
Mitchell Jenkins, a former Republican U.S. Congressman from Pennsylvania; he lived in Shavertown toward the end of his life
Greg Manusky, NFL football player and coach.
Francis T. McAndrew, Psychologist/Professor/Author
Jay McCarroll, the winning designer of Season 1 of Project Runway; he grew up in Lehman and attended Lake Lehman High School
Dan Meuser, U.S. Representative
Paige Selenski, field hockey player for the US Olympic Team
Greg Skrepenak, former NFL player, Luzerne County Commissioner, and convicted felon
Randy Stair, Eaton Township Weis Market Shooter
T. Newell Wood, Pennsylvania State Senator

Gallery

References 

Unincorporated communities in Luzerne County, Pennsylvania
Wyoming Valley
Unincorporated communities in Pennsylvania